Big Brother, also known as Velký Bratr in Czech, is a reality competition television series broadcast in the Czech Republic by TV Nova in 2005. The Czech version is based on the popular Dutch Big Brother international television franchise, produced by Endemol, where a number of contestants live in an isolated house for a certain period of time. At all times, housemates are under the control of Big Brother, a rule-enforcing authority figure who monitors the behaviour of the housemates, sets tasks and punishments, and provides the only link to the outside world for the contestants. The premiere saw thirteen housemates originally enter the house, with four additional people entering at various points during the programme.

The show caused controversy when contestant Filip Trojovský was recognized as gay porn star Tommy Hansen. Also a commercial model, Trjovský starred in a TV spot for a German milk-company prior to entering the house. A German tabloid revealed the scandal, causing the spot to be taken off the air. When his past became known, Trojovský became the first person to be evicted, and as a result, the ratings quickly fell. He was quickly reinstated as a housemate a few weeks later. In the end, Trojovský, who started a heterosexual relationship in the house, finished in third place.

The winner of this series was David Šin, who won the grand prize of 10,000,000 Czech koruna (400,000 Euro) after spending 113 days inside the Big Brother House.

The programme faced fierce competition from an identical show called VyVolení that aired simultaneously on the rival network TV Prima. As a result, the show suffered in the ratings and did not live up to network expectations. It was cancelled after only one season.

Nominations table

Note

References

External links 
Official Website (defunct)

2000s Czech television series
2005 Czech television seasons
2005 Czech television series debuts
2005 Czech television series endings
Czech
Czech reality television series
TV Nova (Czech TV channel) original programming